Point defence (or point defense; see spelling differences) is the defence of a single object or a limited area, e.g. a ship, building or an airfield, now usually against air attacks and guided missiles. Point defence weapons have a smaller range in contrast to area-defence systems and are placed near or on the object to be protected.

Point defence may include:
 short-ranged interceptor aircraft
 Close-in weapon systems on ship
 land-based short-ranged anti-aircraft guns or surface-to-air missile systems
 Active protection systems on tanks or other armoured fighting vehicles

Coastal artillery to protect harbours is similar conceptually, but is generally not classified as point defence. Similarly, passive systems—electronic countermeasures, decoys, chaff, flares, barrage balloons—are not considered point defence.

Examples 
 Bachem Ba 349 Natter – vertical take-off rocket powered crewed interceptor (prototypes only)
 Messerschmitt Me 163 – World War II-era operational German rocket powered interceptor.
 Goalkeeper CIWS – Gun CIWS in current service by the Dutch navy.
Phalanx CIWS –  20 mm Vulcan cannon mounted on a swivelling base. Notably used on almost all major surface combatants of the US Navy.
 Kashtan CIWS – Gun-Missile CIWS in current service by the Russian navy.
 RIM-116 RAM – Missile CIWS in current use by the US Navy.
 Type 730 – in current use by the Chinese Navy.
 Arena APS – a Russian point defence system for individual armoured vehicles.

See also 
 Zero length launch

References 

Military science